Mettler Toledo is a multinational manufacturer of scales and analytical instruments. It is the largest provider of weighing instruments for use in laboratory, industrial, and food retailing applications. The company also provides various analytical instruments, process analytics instruments, and end-of-line inspection systems. The company operates worldwide with 70% of net sales, derived in equal parts, from Europe and from the Americas. Asian business is included in the remaining 30%. Mettler Toledo is headquartered in Switzerland and incorporated in the United States.

Formation and history

Toledo Scale Company

Allen DeVilbiss, Jr. (1873-1911) was an inventor who lived in Toledo, Ohio, United States. He became interested in the concept of weighing machines, and conceived the idea of an automatic computing pendulum scale. He was able to prove his concept with a local butcher, who realized that customers appreciated the automatic computation which eliminated the risk of overcharging. While his invention gained in popularity, DeVilbiss was not interested in making it a viable business.

In 1900, Henry Theobald (1868-1924) was fired from his job at the National Cash Register Company. He decided to start his own business, and was convinced that selling the automatic computing scales could be a good business. He solicited additional financial investors and purchased the company from DeVilbiss. On July 10, 1901, the Toledo Computing Scale and Cash Register Company was incorporated.

By May 1902, Theobald's company was selling more than 100 cash registers with scales per month. By that time, John H. Patterson, Theobald's boss from NCR, threatened to sue the new company for patent infringements. As an alternative, Patterson offered to purchase all cash register patents and property, along with the stipulation that Theobald would no longer engage in the cash register business. The investors, who worried about the costs of patent infringement litigation, agreed to the sale in June 1902. Since cash registers were no longer part of Theobald's business, he changed the name to Toledo Computing Scale Company. Theobald later coined the phrase "No Springs, Honest Weight" as a slogan for the new company.

In the years that followed, Theobald realized that the weighing scale was the most important part of the retail transaction between the merchant and the customer. He felt that many of his competitors who used spring scale technology, especially Dayton Scale Company, were allowing merchants to cheat their customers by incorrectly calculating the total price of a measured good. He campaigned for more government regulation of weights and measures to eliminate dishonest weighing systems. On October 1, 1907, Massachusetts adopted the first weights and measures laws in the United States.

In 1912, the company name changed once again, to Toledo Scale Company. Additionally, a new scale line featuring a double pendulum mechanism and a dial face was introduced and was most suited for industrial applications.

In 1957, Reliance Electric Co, merged with Toledo Scale Co. Reliance paid about $70million in stock for the purchase.

Mettler Instruments AG
In 1945, Dr. Erhard Mettler Rook, a Swiss engineer, started a precision mechanics company in Küsnacht, Switzerland. He invented the substitution principle with a single-pan balance, capable of being produced in series. Analytical balances with a single weighing pan gradually replaced conventional two-pan balances in the laboratory.

Mettler diversified its product line in 1970 with the introduction of its automated titration systems, and the acquisition of balance manufacturer Microwa AG. Mettler acquired its 500-employee competitor August Sauter KG, of Albstadt-Ebingen, Germany, in 1971, for its specialized industrial and retail scales.

In 1980, Dr. Mettler sold his business to Ciba-Geigy AG. A third pillar - after laboratory and industrial - was created: the retail business. Technological progress had made it possible to advance retail scales to instruments for the management of perishable goods.

Mettler Toledo
In 1989, Reliance Electric sold the Toledo Scale division to Ciba-Geigy AG. The division was then merged with Mettler Instruments. The merger vastly increased the global scope of the company, which, as a result, operated in 18 countries. Mettler acquired another competitor, Ohaus Corp., in 1990. In 1992, the company was incorporated as Mettler Toledo, Inc.

In 1996–97, Mettler Toledo, Inc. was sold by Ciba-Geigy AG to the New York-based AEA Investors Inc., in preparation for a subsequent initial public offering. The initial public offering was completed and began trading on the New York Stock Exchange, under the ticker symbol .

The resultant company is currently headquartered in Greifensee, Switzerland, with offices for its many brands based around the world.

Operational structure
Mettler-Toledo is a global manufacturer and marketer of precision instruments for use in laboratory, industrial, and food retailing applications. They are geographically diversified with sales in 2012 derived 34% from Europe, 34% from the Americas, and 32% from Asia and other countries. The company has an extensive global sales and service organization with approximately 6,000, or approximately one-half, of the employees providing sales and service in 36 countries. The company has a manufacturing presence in Europe, the United States, and China.

Laboratory Instruments
In 1952, the measurement of up to one ten-millionth of a gram became possible with the laboratory balance products. "The Mettler Balance" proved to be a catchphrase in the laboratory. Consequently, with the advancement of microprocessor technology over the years, a wide range of products for the laboratory were invented, like automated titrators and thermal analyzers. Mettler-Toledo laboratory products and technology were able to improve processes in research and development, drug discovery, and quality control. Application-specific software for balances provides data analysis opportunities to enhance accuracy, productivity, and compliance. The most recent product development for the laboratory was the array-based UV/VIS spectrophotometer which encompasses four different units including UV5, UV7, UV5Bio, and UV5Nano.

RAININ Instrument
In 2001, Mettler-Toledo purchased Rainin Instrument, LLC, which is now a wholly owned subsidiary of Mettler-Toledo. Rainin supplies precision manual liquid handling instruments and calibration services worldwide. Under the Rainin brand, Mettler Toledo provides advanced liquid handling solutions for life scientists worldwide, offering a wide selection of ergonomic manual pipettes, electronic pipettes, multichannel pipettes, patented BioClean LTS, and universal pipette tips. Rainin developed the first complete pipetting solution called Pipetting 360°, which significantly increases the reproducibility of basic research steps. An estimated 3 million scientists have benefited from improved research results and reductions in repetitive strain injuries (RSI) with the ergonomic Rainin LTS pipettes and tips.

AutoChem
The Mettler-Toledo AutoChem Inc. develops process analytical technology (PAT), automated reactors, and in situ sampling for use in the chemical, pharmaceutical, and academia industries. Specifically, in situ spectroscopy and automated sampling provides continuous analysis of chemical reactions; inline particle size analysis enables crystallization, suspension, and emulsion development with real-time particle size and shape measurements; and automated reactors and reaction calorimetry provides process knowledge to eliminate scale-up and safety incidents. As Mettler Toledo built the franchise from a startup operation in the early 1990s, several companies were acquired. These acquisitions included ASI Applied System Inc., Lasentec®, and the Virtual Lab software business from Avantium to assemble the technology platforms required to develop and maintain its market leading position.

Thornton 
Thornton, Inc. Process Analytics Division  founded in 1964 develops, manufactures, markets, and supplies instrumentation and sensors used for liquid process measurement and control applications. The instrumentation provides pure water treatment measurement & control for the pharmaceutical industry; and parameters of conductivity/resistivity, TOC, pH, DO, dissolved ozone and flow for the semiconductor and power industries. Thornton acquired microbial detection startup Instant BioScan, Inc. in 2015 to become the first manufacturer of instrumentation within the pharmaceutical industry to offer real-time measurement solutions for all three regulated parameters by global pharmacopeias for ultra pure water, adding bioburden analysis to their portfolio.

Ingold 
Founded in 1948 by Dr. Werner Ingold, Ingold specializes in sensors and electrodes for pH, dissolved oxygen, conductivity, turbidity, and dissolved  for process analytics applications in the chemical, pharmaceutical, brewery, and sugar industries.

Industrial Instruments division
The Company manufactures numerous industrial weighing instruments and related terminals and offer software for the pharmaceutical, chemical, food and other industries. In addition, it manufactures metal detection and other end-of-line product inspection systems used in production and packaging. The Company supplies automatic identification and data capture solutions, which integrate in-motion weighing, dimensioning, and identification technologies for transport, shipping, and logistics customers. The company also offers heavy industrial scales and related software.

Cargoscan
Mettler-Toledo Cargoscan Dimensioning solutions are used by international transport companies, small carriers, warehouses, and distribution centres around the world. Systems are all approved according to international weights and measures standards, ensuring high instrument performance. It has been shown that laser range finder technology provides high accuracy in the industry making an impact on a production's revenue.

Hi-Speed
Hi-Speed division joined Mettler-Toledo in 1981 to provide weighing solutions for laboratory, industrial, and food retailing applications. The Product Inspection Team provides the checkweighers, metal detection devices, and other end-of-line inspection systems for local and multinational companies worldwide

Safeline
Safeline started in 1989 with an industrial metal detector for food inspection applications, and was acquired by Mettler Toledo in 1997. The company manufacturers a range of metal detectors for food, pharmaceutical, and non-food applications.

To expand the detection solutions, Mettler Toledo acquired AVS Raytech and AVS Metrology in 2000. AVS Raytech manufactured x-ray inspection equipment. The x-ray inspection equipment combined with detection products allowed companies to identify multiple contaminants as well as verifying product integrity and portion control.

CI-Vision 
Mettler-Toledo CI-Vision is a wholly owned subsidiary of Mettler-Toledo Inc. The Mettler-Toledo Product Inspection Group, consisting of CI-Vision, Hi-Speed, and Safeline, is a supplier of in-line checkweighers, metal detectors, machine vision systems, and x-ray inspection systems.

Charitable contributions
Mettler-Toledo actively participates in the United Way organization. The company offers employees opportunities to contribute financially or by supporting volunteer activity during paid company hours.

References

External links

Companies based in the Columbus, Ohio metropolitan area
Companies listed on the New York Stock Exchange
Greifensee, Zürich
Instrument-making corporations
Manufacturing companies based in Ohio
Sensors
Swiss brands
Technology companies of Switzerland
Weighing scale manufacturers